Down to Believing is the eighth studio album by American singer-songwriter Allison Moorer. It was released on March 16, 2015 by eOne Nashville and sees her reunited with producer Kenny Greenberg who produced her first two albums. The album was recorded over two years and inspired by events in her personal life during that time including her divorce from Steve Earle and her young son's diagnosis with autism.

Critical reception
Upon release, Down to Believing received positive acclaim from critics. Uncut Magazine wrote that "Out of the pain and anger, Moorer has fashioned the finest album of her career"  while AllMusic wrote it was "an emotionally raw yet aesthetically fine album. She may have reached into the depths for these songs, but she's delivered us the gift of a burning light." Thierry Côté of Exclaim! wrote that "even in the rare moments when the production comes dangerously close to generic modern country sheen, Moorer's voice remains a warm, unwavering instrument and the songs are never less than deeply affecting and emotionally resonant."

Track listing

Personnel
 Chad Cromwell - drums
 John Deaderick - keyboards
 Dan Dugmore - 12-string electric guitar, steel guitar, mandolin
 Fred Eltringham - drums, percussion
 Kenny Greenberg - acoustic guitar, electric guitar
 Jedd Hughes - acoustic guitar
 Jon Conley - banjo, acoustic guitar, mandolin
 Brad Jones - upright bass
 Tim Lauer - keyboards 
 Rachel Loy - bass guitar
 Tony Lucido - bass guitar
 Eamon McLaughlin - strings, string arrangements
 Steve Mackey - bass guitar
 Allison Moorer - acoustic guitar, piano, tambourine, lead vocals, background vocals
 Bryan Owings - drums
 Russ Pahl - acoustic guitar, steel guitar
 Ben Phillips - drums
 Lex Price - bouzouki
 Michael Rhodes - bass guitar
 Mike Rojas - keyboards

Chart performance
The album debuted on the Top Country Albums chart at No. 26, and No. 8 on the Heatseeker Albums chart, with 1,600 copies sold for its debut week.

References

2015 albums
Allison Moorer albums
E1 Music albums
Proper Records albums
Albums produced by Kenny Greenberg